Titans Preseason Football is a live game presentation of Tennessee Titans pre-season football games not shown nationally on network television. The program is broadcast on the Titans Preseason Television Network, a unit of ABC Television Network affiliate WKRN-TV of Nashville, Tennessee. As of August 2015, the program is sponsored by Nissan, Tennessee Lottery, and by Comcast/Xfinity. The program is a production of WKRN-TV and its parent company, Nexstar Media Group.

History
The Titans Preseason Television Network was formed in 1999 after the football franchise moved to the then-new Adelphia Coliseum (later LP Field, now Nissan Stadium). WKRN-TV has been the flagship station of all pre-season Tennessee Titans preseason game broadcasts, with the exception of any preseason games broadcast nationally.

Currently, the games are called by WKRN sports director Cory Curtis. Former Titans running back Eddie George provides color analogy, and sideline reports are provided by Audra Martin, who also serves as a sports anchor at WKRN.

Titans Preseason Television Network affiliates
This is a list of all the television stations that broadcast all Titans Preseason Network-produced games.

Tennessee

Other states

Former affiliates

Titans Preseason Television Network Game schedules

2002
Saturday, August 10: St. Louis Rams @ TENNESSEE TITANS 
Friday, August 23: TENNESSEE TITANS @ Minnesota Vikings 
Friday, August 30: TENNESSEE TITANS @ Green Bay Packers

2003
Saturday, August 9: Cleveland Browns @ TENNESSEE TITANS 
Saturday, August 23: TENNESSEE TITANS @ Cincinnati Bengals 
Thursday, August 29: TENNESSEE TITANS @ Green Bay Packers

2004
Saturday, August 14: Cleveland Browns @ TENNESSEE TITANS
Saturday, August 21: TENNESSEE TITANS @ Buffalo Bills
Friday, September 3: Green Bay Packers @ TENNESSEE TITANS

2008
Saturday, August 9: St. Louis Rams @ TENNESSEE TITANS (TEN 34, STL 13) 
Friday, August 22: TENNESSEE TITANS @ Atlanta Falcons (ATL 17, TEN 3) 
Thursday, August 28: TENNESSEE TITANS @ Green Bay Packers (TEN 23, GB 21)

2009
Saturday, August 15: Tampa Bay Buccaneers @ Tennessee Titans 
 Saturday, August 29: Tennessee Titans @ Cleveland Browns 
Thursday, September 3: Green Bay Packers @ Tennessee Titans

2010
Saturday, August 14: Tennessee Titans @ Seattle Seahawks (SEA 30, TEN 28) 
Saturday, August 28: Tennessee Titans @ Carolina Panthers 
Thursday, September 2: New Orleans Saints @ Tennessee Titans (TEN 27, NO 24)

2011
Saturday, August 13: Minnesota Vikings @ Tennessee Titans
Saturday, August 20:  Tennessee Titans @ St. Louis Rams 
Saturday, August 27: Chicago Bears @ Tennessee Titans
Thursday, September 1: Tennessee Titans @ New Orleans Saints

2012
Saturday, August 11: Tennessee Titans @ Seattle Seahawks 
Friday, August 17: Tennessee Titans @ Tampa Bay Buccaneers 
Thursday, August 30: New Orleans Saints @ Tennessee Titans

2013
August 8: Washington, DC Redskins @ Tennessee Titans (WASH 22, TENN 21)
August 17: Tennessee Titans @ Cincinnati Bengals (CIN 27, TEN 19) 
August 24: Atlanta Falcons @ Tennessee Titans (TEN 27, ATL 19)
August 29: Tennessee Titans @ Minnesota Vikings(MIN 24, TEN 23)

2014
August 9: Green Bay Packers @ Tennessee Titans (TEN 20, GB 16) 
August 15: Tennessee Titans @ New Orleans Saints (NO 31, TEN 24) 
August 23: Tennessee Titans @ Atlanta Falcons (TEN 24, ATL 17)
August 28: Minnesota Vikings @ Tennessee Titans (MINN 28, TENN 3)

2015
Friday, August 14: Tennessee Titans @ Atlanta Falcons (ATL 31, TEN 24)
This game was also shown nationally on NFL Network. 
Friday, August 28: Tennessee Titans @ Kansas City Chiefs (KC 34, TEN 10) 
Thursday, September 3: Minnesota Vikings @ Tennessee Titans (TEN 24, MIN 17)

2016
Saturday, August 13: San Diego Chargers @ TENNESSEE TITANS (SD 10, TEN 27) 
Saturday, August 20: Carolina Panthers @ TENNESSEE TITANS (CAR 26, TEN 16)
Thursday, September 1: TENNESSEE TITANS @ Miami Dolphins (TEN 24, MIA 10)

2017
Saturday, August 12: TENNESSEE TITANS @ New York Jets (TEN 3, NYJ 7)
Saturday, August 19: Carolina Panthers @ TENNESSEE TITANS (CAR 27, TEN 34)
Thursday, August 31: TENNESSEE TITANS @ Kansas City Chiefs (TEN 6, KC 30)

2018
Thursday, August 7: TENNESSEE TITANS @ Green Bay Packers (TEN 17, GB 31)
Saturday, August 18: Tampa Bay Buccaneers @ TENNESSEE TITANS (TB 30, TEN 14)
Saturday, August 25: TENNESSEE TITANS @ Pittsburgh Steelers (TEN 6, PIT 16)
Thursday, August 30: Minnesota Vikings @ TENNESSEE TITANS (MIN 13, TEN 3)

2019
Thursday, August 8: Tennessee Titans @ Philadelphia Eagles (TEN 27, PHI 10)
Saturday, August 17: New England Patriots @ Tennessee Titans (NE 22, TEN 17)
Thursday, August 29: Tennessee Titans @ Chicago Bears (TEN 19, CHI 15)

2020
Preseason was cancelled due to the COVID-19 pandemic.

2021
Friday, August 13: Tennessee Titans @ Atlanta Falcons (TEN 23, ATL 3)
Saturday, August 21: Tennessee Titans @ Tampa Bay Buccaneers (TEN 34, TB 3)
Saturday, August 28: Chicago Bears @ Tennessee Titans (CHI 27, TEN 24)

2022
Thursday, August 11: Tennessee Titans @ Baltimore Ravens
Saturday, August 20: Tampa Bay Buccaneers @ Tennessee Titans
Saturday, August 27: Arizona Cardinals @ Tennessee Titans

References

External links
TitansOnline.com - The Official Website of the Tennessee Titans
WKRN-TV Official Website

1999 American television series debuts
American sports television series
National Football League on television
Tennessee Titans